Sadia Imam is a television actress in Pakistan.

Early life
Sadia Imam was born in Rawalpindi, Punjab, Pakistan. She is a Pakistani television presenter, actress and model. She has appeared in commercials, dramas, and music videos.

Career
Sadia has starred in several famous dramas such as Jab Jab Dil Miley, Colony 52, Dorhi, Tapish, Anokha Bandhan, Aangan Bhar Chandni, Koonj and Aasman. She is one of the most popular stars in the Media right now, and also performs as a Model for famous fashion houses. Regarded as one of the most dashing models on the ramp, Sadia is also a very good actor, and also did a comic role in a guest appearance she made on popular ARY Digital drama serial Mai Aur Tum. Since her return from Germany she started working with GEO TV and HUM in their upcoming serials, and she is currently also a TV Host for the Samaa TV Show 'Samaa Kay Mehmaan' where she interviews celebrities and famous faces of Pakistan.

Television Presenter
 Samaa Kay Mehmaan on Samaa TV in 2015. 
Mast Mornings TV show for Dawn News

Television 

 Choti Si Kahani
 Naseeb (PTV Home)
 Pehli Barish
 Bande Ali Khan Aur Bandgi (PTV Short Drama)
 Saat Sur Rishton Ke
 Diya
 Ghareeb e Shehr
 Thora Sa Aasman
 Pani Pe Naam
 Pyar Mein
 Singhar
 Kahan Se Kahan Tak
Umrao Jan Ada (serial)
 Dil Dard Dhuan
 Rani Beti Raaj Karey
 Anokha Bandhan
 Kinara Mil Gaya Hota
 Usay Bhool Ja
 Wafa aka Loyalty
 Hum Se Juda Na Hona
 Aangan Bhar Chandni
 Dohri
 Sirf Aik Baar
 Colony 52
 Maamta
 Jab Jab Dil Milay
 Uljhan
 Ijazat
 Chahat (PTV Home)
 Abhi Door Hai Kinara (PTV Home)
 Bilqees Kaur (Hum TV)
 Ishq Junoon Deewangi
 Khaali Haath (STN)
 Musafat
 Roshan Sitara

Filmography 
 Jay Eeman Smaja  Bay Eeman Numaja

Awards and nominations
 Nomination for Best Actress in a Leading Role for Dohri on ARY TV in 2007 Lux Style Awards.

Lux Style Awards

See also 
 List of Pakistani actresses

References

External links
 
 Sadia, Mishi and Zeba: lame trio | DAWN.COM
 And now Sadia Imam, the poet | Dawn (newspaper)

Living people
Pakistani female models
Pakistani television actresses
Punjabi people
Actresses from Rawalpindi
20th-century Pakistani actresses
21st-century Pakistani actresses
1979 births